Biri is a former municipality in the old Oppland county, Norway. The  municipality existed from 1838 until its dissolution in 1964. The area is now part of Gjøvik Municipality in the traditional district of Vestoppland. The administrative centre was the village of Biri.

History
The parish of Biri was established as a municipality on 1 January 1838 (see formannskapsdistrikt law). On 1 January 1910, the municipality of Biri was divided in half. The western part (population: 2,028) became Snertingdal Municipality and the eastern part (population: 2,815) continued as Biri Municipality. During the 1960s, there were many municipal mergers across Norway due to the work of the Schei Committee. On 1 January 1964, the municipality of Biri (population: 3,274) was merged with the town of Gjøvik (population: 8,251), the municipality of Snertingdal (population: 2,471), and most of the municipality of Vardal (population: (9,612) to create a new Gjøvik Municipality with 23,608 residents.

Name
The municipality is named "Biri" after the old Biri farm since the first Biri Church was located there. The name is presumably very old, and the meaning is unknown.

Government
All municipalities in Norway, including Biri, are responsible for primary education (through 10th grade), outpatient health services, senior citizen services, unemployment and other social services, zoning, economic development, and municipal roads. The municipality was governed by a municipal council of elected representatives, which in turn elected a mayor.

Municipal council
The municipal council  of Biri was made up of 21 representatives that were elected to four year terms.  The party breakdown of the final municipal council was as follows:

Mayor
The mayors of Biri:

1837-1843: Christian Semb 	
1844-1845: Nils Larsen Melby 
1846-1847: Nils Johan Hagerup 	
1848-1849: Anders Lysgaard d.y. 	
1850-1851: Nils Larsen Melby 	
1852-1855: Anders Lysgaard d.y. 	
1856-1857: Johannes Alseth 	
1858-1859: Halvor Olsen 	
1860-1867: Iver Lier 	
1868-1871: Nils Berg 	
1872-1873: Johannes Alseth 	
1874-1875: Even Nøss 	
1876-1881: Mathias Larsen Bratberg 
1882-1883: Anton Skulhus 	
1890-1893: Julius Bjørnstad
1894-1895: Anton Skulhus 	
1896-1904: Iver Fliflet 	
1905-1907: Ole E. Huskelhus
1908-1910: Kristian Oudenstad (LL)
1911-1913: Julius Bjørnstad 
1914-1931: Hagbart Wiklund (AD) 
1932-1934: Einar Sigstad
1935-1941: Henrik Eilert Brekke (Ap)
1941-1941: Harald Bratberg
1941-1945: Einar Sigstad 
1945-1951: Henrik Eilert Brekke (Ap)
1952-1963: Nils Røstadstuen (Ap)

See also
List of former municipalities of Norway

References

Gjøvik
Former municipalities of Norway
1838 establishments in Norway
1964 disestablishments in Norway